"Losing Grip" is a song by Canadian singer-songwriter Avril Lavigne, released as the fourth single and the first track from her debut album, Let Go (except in New Zealand, where "Mobile" was released), in March 2003. The song was written by Lavigne and Clif Magness, and produced by Magness. The song, which is lyrically about Lavigne "losing grip" with her boyfriend as they are just not meant to be, is much heavier with grunge oriented sounds than most of the songs on Let Go that had a more poppy feel. She performed "Losing Grip" at the Juno Awards of 2003. The song's video single was certified Gold by the RIAA on September 22, 2003.

Background
Arista Records intended for "Anything but Ordinary" to serve as the fourth single from Let Go, although Lavigne successfully pressed the label to release "Losing Grip" instead.

Music video
The music video was directed by Liz Friedlander and was filmed on February 25 and 26, 2003 at the Angel Orensanz Foundation in New York City. It shows scenes of Lavigne and her band performing in front of a large crowd. There are also shots of her moshing and surfing through the crowd while pushing, punching and shoving people from time to time. The "crowd surfing" routine was practiced by other people on the audience during the shoot before Lavigne was allowed to do so.

Reception
Christina Saraceno of AllMusic noted that "Losing Grip" allowed Lavigne to "show off" her vocal ability during the song's "explosive rock chorus". Sal Cinquemani of Slant magazine also praised Lavigne's vocals and compared them to Canadian singer-songwriter Alanis Morissette.

Awards and nominations
"Losing Grip" was nominated for the Grammy Award for Best Female Rock Vocal Performance, but lost to "Trouble" by Pink.

Track listings

CD
"Losing Grip" (album version) – 3:53
"Losing Grip" (live) – 4:56

Australian CD
"Losing Grip" (album version) – 3:53
"I'm with You" (live) – 3:57
"Unwanted" (live) – 4:01
"Losing Grip" (video)

European CD
"Losing Grip" (album version) – 3:53
"Losing Grip" (live) – 4:56
"Naked" (live) – 4:24
"Losing Grip" (video)

Cassette
"Losing Grip" (album version) – 3:53
"Losing Grip" (live) – 4:56
"Naked" (live) – 4:24
"Losing Grip" (album version) – 3:53
"Losing Grip" (live) – 4:56
"Naked" (live) – 4:24

Charts

Certifications

|-
! colspan="3"| Video Single
|-

Release history

References

Avril Lavigne songs
2003 singles
Music videos directed by Liz Friedlander
Songs written by Avril Lavigne
Arista Records singles
Songs written by Clif Magness
Nu metal songs
Grunge songs